Corynebacterium bovis is a pathogenic  bacterium that causes mastitis and pyelonephritis in cattle.

C. bovis is a facultatively anaerobic,  Gram-positive organism, characterized by nonencapsulated, nonsporulated, immobile, straight or curved rods with a length of 1 to 8 µm and width of 0.3 to 0.8 µm, which forms ramified aggregations in culture (looking like "Chinese characters"). 

In mastitic infections, C. bovis is spread from cow to cow most commonly through improper milking technique. However, it is usually a mild infection resulting in an elevated somatic cell count.
The bacterium is sensitive to the majority of antibiotics, such as the penicillins, ampicillin, cephalosporins, quinolones, chloramphenicol, tetracyclines, cefuroxime, and trimethoprim.

References

External links
 Type strain of Corynebacterium bovis at BacDive -  the Bacterial Diversity Metadatabase

Corynebacterium
Gram-positive bacteria
Bacteria described in 1923
Animal bacterial diseases
Bovine diseases